Nita Gale Bieber (July 18, 1926 – February 4, 2019) was an American actress and dancer.

Early years 
Bieber was born in Los Angeles, California, the daughter of Callie Mae (Robbins) and William Carl Bieber. She was one of five siblings who studied dancing from childhood. After graduating from Hollywood High School, she traveled with a USO troupe.

Film career
In 1946, Bieber appeared in several films for Columbia Pictures, most notably Rhythm and Weep with the Three Stooges. In 1947, she appeared in three more films for Columbia and also appeared in a couple of Monogram flicks, most notably as Mame in the Bowery Boys movie News Hounds. She was featured in a full-page photo on the cover of the November 28, 1949, issue of Life magazine.

The article described her 7-year contract with MGM and Nita's big dance number in the new movie musical Nancy Goes to Rio; but her dance was not included in the final release (it does, however, appear in the home video DVD version). Bieber appeared in movies for MGM and Universal until 1955. She appeared as the character Sarah Higgins in Summer Stock, starring Judy Garland and Gene Kelly. Bieber also worked with stars such as Tony Curtis (The Prince Who Was a Thief), Hedy Lamarr (A Lady Without Passport), and Larry Fine (Rhythm and Weep). Her final movie before retiring was Kismet (1955) with Howard Keel and Vic Damone.

The Nita Bieber Dancers
Bieber was the creator of her own dance group, The Nita Bieber Dancers, which gave short performances produced in 1951-1952 for local television stations needing "filler" programming, including those for Jerry Gray (1950) and The Colgate Comedy Hour (1954; with Dean Martin and Jerry Lewis). They headlined in Las Vegas (El Rancho Vegas, 1951, with Benny Goodman) and in 1952 were showcased at the Frontier Hotel.

In the early 1950s, Bieber's dancing career was interrupted when she was diagnosed with polio. Doctors told her that her dancing was ended and she might never walk again, but she proved them wrong and returned to performing.

Personal life
Bieber married Dr. Jack Wall, a dentist. They had two children.

Filmography

Film

Television

References

External links
 
 
 Official website
 Life.com

1926 births
2019 deaths
American film actresses
American stage actresses
20th-century American actresses
Place of death missing
Actresses from Los Angeles
Metro-Goldwyn-Mayer contract players
American female dancers
American dancers
People from Avalon, California
21st-century American women